The following radio stations broadcast on AM frequency 1600 kHz: 1600 AM is classified as a regional frequency by the Federal Communications Commission.

Argentina
 Armonia in Caseros
 EME in Montes de Oca, Santa Fe

Mexico
 XEGEM-AM in Metepec, State of Mexico

United States

References

External links
 Radio Locator list of stations on 1600

Lists of radio stations by frequency